Biatan-e Olya (also Romanized as Bīātān-e ‘Olyā, Bayātān-e ‘Olyā, and Bayatan Olya; also known as Bayātān-e Bālā, Beyātān-e Bālā, and Bīātān) is a village in Kamazan-e Sofla Rural District, Zand District, Malayer County, Hamadan Province, Iran. At the 2006 census, its population was 78, in 28 families.

References 

Populated places in Malayer County